Quatuor Habanera is a saxophone quartet established in 1993. Composed of players from the Conservatoire de Paris, the quartet has won seven international prizes and recorded six albums. Their ability to adapt to varied musical styles is noted, recording contemporary music of Ligeti, Xenakis, Donatoni as successfully as earlier works by Glazunov, Grieg and Dvorak. They have collaborated with jazz musicians, most notably Louis Sclavis and klezmer clarinetist David Krakauer.

International Prizes 
1st Prize at the International Jean-Marie LONDEIX, Bordeaux 1996
	
1st Prix du Concours International de Musique de Chambre, Illzach 1997 
	
1st Prix du 3ème Internationaler Musikwettbewerb für Junge Kultur, Düsseldorf 1997
	
1st Grand Prix du Concours International de Musique Française, Guérande 1997
	
1st prize in the Musical Sets Europeans Privas 1998
	
1st Prix du Concours International de Musique de Chambre "Gaetano Zigetti", Sanguinetto 1999	

Grand Prix du 12ème Forum Musical de Normandie, 1996

Discography 

Saxophone D'aujourd'hui et de demain (Concours International J.-M. Londeix, Bordeaux 1997)

Les révélations classiques (l'ADAMI 2000)

HABANERA - Quatuor de saxophones

Mysterious Morning (Alpha 010)

Grieg, Glazunov, Dvorak (Alpha 041)

L'Engrenage (Alpha 518)

External links 
 http://quatuor.habanera.free.fr/

Saxophone quartets
Musical groups established in 1993